Svetlana Vyacheslavovna Nageykina (born February 2, 1965, in Tambov) is a former Soviet/Russian cross-country skier who competed during the 1980s, training at Spartak. She won a gold medal in the 4 × 5 km relay at the 1988 Winter Olympics in Calgary for the Soviet Union.

In 2000 and 2002, she won Vasaloppet.

Cross-country skiing results
All results are sourced from the International Ski Federation (FIS).

Olympic Games
 1 medal – (1 gold)

World Championships

a.  Cancelled due to extremely cold weather.

World Cup

Season standings

Individual podiums
1 victory 
18 podiums

Team podiums

 13 victories 
 25 podiums 

Note:   Until the 1994 Olympics, Olympic races were included in the World Cup scoring system.

References

CNN Sports Illustrated Profile

External links
 
 
 

Russian female cross-country skiers
Belarusian female cross-country skiers
Soviet female cross-country skiers
Olympic cross-country skiers of the Soviet Union
Olympic gold medalists for the Soviet Union
Cross-country skiers at the 1988 Winter Olympics
Cross-country skiers at the 1994 Winter Olympics
Cross-country skiers at the 1998 Winter Olympics
Cross-country skiers at the 2002 Winter Olympics
Olympic cross-country skiers of Russia
Olympic cross-country skiers of Belarus
1965 births
Living people
Spartak athletes
Olympic medalists in cross-country skiing
Medalists at the 1988 Winter Olympics
Sportspeople from Tambov